James Murdock, born David Lee Baker, (June 22, 1931 – December 24, 1981) was an American film and television actor. He was known for playing Mushy in the American western television series Rawhide.

Life and career 
Murdock was born in Normal, Illinois, the son of Faye Baker. He reportedly used the surname "Murdock" because he thought is sounded tougher and would help him get roles. He began his acting career in 1958 playing a young outlaw in the western television series Have Gun, Will Travel. In 1959, he joined the cast of the new CBS western television series Rawhide playing the assistant cook Mushy. Murdock made a guest appearance in a 1966 episode of the western television series Gunsmoke.

Murdock had some small roles in films under the name David Baker, including Some of My Best Friends Are... in 1971 and Airport 1975 and The Godfather Part II in 1974.

Death 
Murdock died on December 24, 1981, of pneumonia in Calabasas, California, at the age of 50. He was buried in Cypress Lawn Memorial Park.

References

External links 

Rotten Tomatoes profile

1931 births
1981 deaths
Deaths from pneumonia in California
People from Normal, Illinois
Male actors from Illinois
American male film actors
American male television actors
20th-century American male actors
Western (genre) television actors
Burials at Cypress Lawn Memorial Park